The Invaders (or The New Invaders) is a two-part television miniseries revival based on the 1967-68 original series The Invaders. Directed by Paul Shapiro, the miniseries was first aired in 1995. Scott Bakula starred as Nolan Wood, who discovers the alien conspiracy, and Roy Thinnes appears very briefly as David Vincent, now an old man handing the burden over to Wood.

Plot
Former Air Force officer Nolan Wood, an inmate in prison for manslaughter charges,  meets David Vincent (from the original TV series) while both are in prison. Vincent tells Nolan a fantastic story about the alien conspiracy to control the world. Wood begins to have visions about aliens and UFOs.

Later, Wood (Bakula),  now a recently released convict, is taken over by aliens. He thinks he is able to throw off their control with the help of nurse Garza (Pena). In fact the control and Wood's apparent successful resistance and visions are part of a plot by the aliens to kill a Harvard ecologist. 
 
With knowledge of the aliens’ plot, Wood must save a presidential candidate on a train that is out of control

Cast 
 Scott Bakula : Nolan Wood 
 Elizabeth Peña : Ellen Garza 
 Richard Thomas : Jerry Thayer 
 DeLane Matthews : Amanda Thayer 
 Terence Knox : Lt. Coyle
 Raoul Trujillo : Carlos Suarez 
 Shannon Kenny : Grace
 Mario Yedidia : Kyle Thayer
 Richard Belzer : Randy Stein 
 Roy Thinnes : David Vincent
 Erik King : Doctor Josh Webber
 Debra Jo Rupp : Rita
 Todd Susman : Capt. Johnson
 Jon Cypher : Senator Alex Feinman
 Channon Roe : Rudnik
 Jack Kehler : Monck Patterson
 Jon Polito : Whitley

Production
The premise was used as the basis for a four-hour television miniseries on Fox. The miniseries has been released in some countries on home video, edited into a single movie. The first part aired on November 12, 1995; part 2 aired on November 14, 1995 (both in two-hour time slots).

The miniseries was in essence an extended television pilot, and there were plans for Thinnes to be a recurring character, although Bakula's participation was thought to be limited should it have made it to a series.

Reception
Creature Feature gave the movie 2.5 out of five stars, finding the beginning to be promising but devolving into standard fare.

Notes 
In the original broadcast version, the aliens were never shown.  They do appear in subsequent airing on SYFY and on the DVD.

References

External links 

1990s American television miniseries
American science fiction films
1995 American television series debuts
1995 American television series endings
Films set in Los Angeles
Television series reunion films
Alien invasions in films